The 1899 St. Louis Perfectos season was the team's 18th season in St. Louis, Missouri and their 8th season in the National League. The Perfectos went 84–67 during the season and finished 5th in the National League.

This was the team's only season in which they were named the Perfectos. The Robison brothers, who had just bought the team from original owner Chris von der Ahe, changed the colors to red, the name of the team to Perfectos, and the name of the ballpark to League Park. The red color proved so popular that fans and sportswriters began referring to the team by the shade of red, cardinal. The next season, the team officially became the Cardinals.

The team benefited from many players who were transferred to the team from the Cleveland Spiders, which were also owned by the Robison brothers. This led to the Spiders compiling the worst season in MLB history, losing 134 games. However, the Perfectos wound up finishing only fifth. The pennant-winning Brooklyn Superbas, who finished 18½ games ahead of St. Louis, benefited from a similar arrangement, as Brooklyn's owners also owned the Baltimore Orioles, allowing them to also transfer their better players to one team. After the 1899 season, such arrangements were outlawed in the National League, and both the Spiders and Orioles were among four teams eliminated from the league.

Offseason

Notable transactions 
 March 29, 1899: Jack O'Connor was assigned to the Perfectos by the Cleveland Spiders.

Regular season

Season standings

Record vs. opponents

Roster

Player stats

Batting

Starters by position 
Note: Pos = Position; G = Games played; AB = At bats; H = Hits; Avg. = Batting average; HR = Home runs; RBI = Runs batted in

Other batters 
Note: G = Games played; AB = At bats; H = Hits; Avg. = Batting average; HR = Home runs; RBI = Runs batted in

Pitching

Starting pitchers 
Note: G = Games pitched; IP = Innings pitched; W = Wins; L = Losses; ERA = Earned run average; SO = Strikeouts

Other pitchers 
Note: G = Games pitched; IP = Innings pitched; W = Wins; L = Losses; ERA = Earned run average; SO = Strikeouts

Relief pitchers 
Note: G = Games pitched; W = Wins; L = Losses; SV = Saves; ERA = Earned run average; SO = Strikeouts

References

External links
1899 St. Louis Perfectos at Baseball Reference
1899 St. Louis Perfectos team page at www.baseball-almanac.com

St. Louis Cardinals seasons
Saint Louis Perfectos season
St Louis